Aspergillus protuberus is a species of fungus in the genus Aspergillus. It is from the Versicolores section. The species was first described in 1968.

Growth and morphology

A. protuberus has been cultivated on both Czapek yeast extract agar (CYA) plates and Malt Extract Agar Oxoid® (MEAOX) plates. The growth morphology of the colonies can be seen in the pictures below.

References 

protuberus
Fungi described in 1968